Chocolat Kohler was a chocolate producer based in Lausanne, founded in 1830 by the Kohler brothers. It is currently a brand owned by Nestlé.

History 
The Kohler chocolate factory was one of the first in Switzerland, shortly following that of Cailler. The first factory was created in 1830 by Charles-Amédée Kohler, and his brother Frédéric Kohler, sons of Amédée Kohler (1761-1833), a trader in colonial foodstuffs since 1793. In 1849, Charles-Amédée Kohler bought the municipal sawmill in the Sauvabelin forest where he moved the production of chocolate. The newly built factory used the hydraulic power of the Flon river to allow the grinding of the cocoa beans. The installation of a steam engine would replace the hydraulic facility a few years later and allow a considerable development of the factory.

In 1865, Charles-Amédée sold the business to his two sons Charles-Amédée II and Adolphe, who were succeeded by the sons of the first, Amédée-Louis and Jean-Jacques. From 1894 to 1896, they built a new factory in neighbouring Échandens, which worked until 1907. In 1904, a rapprochement took place with Chocolat Peter managed by Daniel Peter in Orbe to form the Peter Kohler company, then with Alexandre Cailler in Vevey in 1911 to form Peter Cailler Kohler. These various mergers led to the takeover of the brand by the Nestlé company in 1929.

Products 
One of the main specialties of the company was hazelnut chocolate. Charles-Amédée Kohler notably created hazelnut chocolate in 1830. His son Charles-Amédée II also invented the Branche, a praline-filled chocolate and hazelnut bar; the product is described in his recipe book from 1896. The Branche has been produced by Cailler since 1904, and ultimately has become one of the most popular candy bars on the Swiss market.

A recurrent advertisement poster showed a wolf attracted by Little Red Riding Hood's basket, the latter being full of Kohler chocolates. Chocolat Kohler was also advertised by French artist Charles Trenet.

See also

Swiss chocolate
List of bean-to-bar chocolate manufacturers

References

Nestlé brands
Companies established in 1830
Brand name chocolate
Swiss chocolate companies
Swiss brands
Food and drink companies established in 1830
1830s establishments in Switzerland
Companies based in the canton of Vaud
Companies based in Lausanne